Iraneh (also Romanized as Īrāneh; also known as Irāneh-ye Sāmen, Īrīneh, Orūneh, Sarāb, and Sarāb Sāmen) is a village in Haram Rud-e Sofla Rural District, Samen District, Malayer County, Hamadan Province, Iran. At the 2006 census, its population was 42, in 12 families.

References 

Populated places in Malayer County